Cesar Gracie Jiu-Jitsu is a mixed martial arts and Brazilian Jiu Jitsu training facility located in Pleasant Hill, California and is home to numerous highly ranked mixed martial artists who compete in organizations such as the Ultimate Fighting Championship (UFC).

History 
The academy was opened by Cesar Gracie. It rose to prominence in the late 2000s based on the success of a close-knit group of Gracie students known as the "Skrap Pack": Jake Shields, Gilbert Melendez, and brothers Nick and Nate Diaz. All fought primarily in the Strikeforce promotion at that time and were some of its most popular stars.

Prior to Jake Shields' UFC signing in 2010, Cesar Gracie Jiu-Jitsu housed champions in three of five weight classes in the Strikeforce promotion. This success helped Cesar Gracie secure a position among the nominees for "Coach of the Year" at the Fighters Only 2010 World MMA Awards.

On April 17, 2010, members of the Cesar Gracie Jiu Jitsu camp were involved in a brawl following the main event at Strikeforce: Nashville in Nashville, Tennessee. The incident began as  Jason Miller, a former opponent of Jake Shields, interrupted Shields' post-fight interview following his decision victory over Dan Henderson. Shields, Nick Diaz, Nate Diaz, and Gilbert Melendez scuffled with Miller after he asked Shields for a rematch. In response to the brawl, the Tennessee Athletic Commission recommended a range of fines and suspensions for the fighters involved.

Notable fighters 
 Bret Bergmark - Strikeforce welterweight fighter
 Cody McKenzie - The Ultimate Fighter Season 12 contestant.
 Leslie Smith - Invicta FC Bantamweight Fighter
 Gil Castillo - UFC veteran, welterweight fighter
 Nate Diaz - UFC lightweight fighter and The Ultimate Fighter Season 5 winner
 Nick Diaz - UFC welterweight fighter and former Strikeforce and WEC champion.
 David Douglas - Strikeforce lightweight fighter 
 Gilbert Melendez - Strikeforce  lightweight champion
 Dave Bautista - WWE professional wrestler, actor, MMA fighter, and purple belt under Cesar Gracie
 Daniel Roberts - UFC welterweight

 Yancy Medeiros - UFC welterweight fighter
 Jake Shields - WSOF Strikeforce  middleweight champion and Elite XC welterweight champion, third place finisher in the under 77KG division at the  2005 ADCC Submission Wrestling World Championship
 Joe Schilling - Glory Middleweight kickboxer, Bellator Middleweight fighter
 David Terrell - UFC veteran, middleweight fighter, third place finisher in the under 88KG division at the  2003 ADCC Submission Wrestling World Championship

See also
List of Top Professional MMA Training Camps

References

External links
 
 Gym information at FiveKnuckles.com

Mixed martial arts training facilities
Karate training facilities
Brazilian jiu-jitsu training facilities
Sports in the San Francisco Bay Area
Education in Contra Costa County, California